Joseph Roy Burke (December 8, 1923 – May 12, 1992) was an American front office executive in Major League Baseball who served as general manager or club president of the Kansas City Royals for almost 18 years during the most successful period in that expansion team's early history.

Burke was executive vice president and general manager of the Royals from the middle of the 1974 season through October 1981. He then served as club president until his death on May 12, 1992. During his tenure, Burke was general manager of the Royals' first American League championship team, the 1980 edition, then was president of the 1985 Royals, who won the franchise's first World Series title. In addition to those two pennant-winners, the Royals won American League West Division championships in 1976, 1977, 1978, 1981 (second half of a split season) and 1984. In , he was named Major League Executive of the Year by The Sporting News after his first division title.

Before coming to Kansas City, Burke had been a member of the front office of the Texas Rangers and its predecessor, the second modern-era Washington Senators franchise. He had begun his baseball career in 1948 with the Louisville Colonels of the Triple-A American Association, where he worked under general manager Ed Doherty. He later was named the Senators' vice president and treasurer, and was retained when Bob Short purchased the Senators in 1968. He accompanied the franchise to Dallas-Fort Worth when it relocated after the  season and became the Rangers' general manager in their first season in North Texas. After two years in that role, Burke moved to the Royals as business manager after the  campaign.

In June 1974, Burke became the second general manager in the Royals' six-year history. One of his first major moves was the hiring of Whitey Herzog as manager during the middle of the 1975 season on July 25. Herzog would be elected to the Baseball Hall of Fame as a manager in 2010, but he had failed dismally as the Rangers' pilot, working under Burke, during 1973. In Kansas City, he would turn the Royals into consistent contenders in the AL West. Burke also appointed Jim Frey and Dick Howser as managers after Herzog's exit, and each man would lead Kansas City to an American League pennant (and, in Howser's case, the 1985 World Series title as well).

Burke became the Royals' second club president after the 1981 season, succeeding owner Ewing Kauffman, and his top assistant, John Schuerholz, was promoted to general manager. Like Herzog, Schuerholz would also be elected to the Baseball Hall of Fame (in 2017, for his later success as GM of the Atlanta Braves).

Burke died of lymphatic cancer in Kansas City, Kansas, at age 68.

References
Obituary, The Washington Post, May 14, 1992.
Obituary, The New York Times, May 14, 1992.
Baseball America Executive Database.
 U.S. Public Records Index Vol. I
 Kentucky Birth Index 1911-1999

1923 births
1992 deaths
Baseball executives
Deaths from cancer in Kansas
Kansas City Royals executives
Major League Baseball general managers
Major League Baseball team presidents
Sportspeople from Louisville, Kentucky
Texas Rangers executives
Washington Senators (1961–1971) executives